The Minnesota State Mavericks men's ice hockey team is an NCAA Division I college ice hockey program that represents Minnesota State University, Mankato. The Mavericks compete in the Central Collegiate Hockey Association (CCHA). Their home arena is the Mayo Clinic Health System Event Center located in downtown Mankato, Minnesota.

History
The Minnesota State Mavericks men's ice hockey team commenced play as a varsity sport in 1969-70. They competed independent of a conference affiliation at the NCAA Division II level from 1969-70 to 1983-84.  From 1984-85 to 1991-92, the Mavericks competed at the NCAA Division III level, before returning to the NCAA Division II ranks from 1992-93 to 1995-96.  Starting with the 1996-97 season, the Mavericks began competition at the NCAA Division I level.  The Mavericks were granted acceptance to the Western Collegiate Hockey Association (WCHA) in 1999-00, and remained with the conference until 2021.

The program saw great success at the NCAA Division II level during the 1970s and 1980s. The Mavericks finished as the NCAA Division II national runner-up in 1979, after being defeated by the University of Massachusetts Lowell 6-4 in the final. The Mavericks were awarded the 1980 NCAA Division II National Championship over Elmira College 5-2 in the championship game. In 1991, while competing at the NCAA Division III level, the Mavericks finished as national runner-up following a loss versus the University of Wisconsin–Stevens Point 6-2. The Mavericks have had sustained success in recent seasons, reaching the NCAA Tournament in consecutive seasons (2013 and 2014) for the first time in program history, winning the Broadmoor Trophy as the WCHA playoff champions in 2014 and the MacNaughton Cup as WCHA regular season champions in 2015. MNSU was the top overall seed in the NCAA Tournament in 2015 but was upset by RIT in the first round, becoming the first No. 1 overall seed to lose in the first round of the NCAA hockey tournament.

They are one of five Minnesota-based universities that competed in the WCHA, the others being Minnesota, Minnesota-Duluth, St. Cloud State, and Bemidji State. After a major hockey conference realignment in 2013, only Minnesota State and Bemidji State remain in the WCHA. Minnesota joined the new men's hockey league of its all-sports conference, the Big Ten, and Minnesota–Duluth and St. Cloud State became charter members of the National Collegiate Hockey Conference.  The five schools once competed annually for the North Star College Cup, hosted by the University of Minnesota at the Xcel Energy Center in St. Paul, Minnesota.

On March 29, 2017, the university announced that it was in negotiations to extend the contract of head coach Mike Hastings by 10 years (through the 2027-28 season), providing its coach with the longest contract term in all of Division I men's hockey. In addition to the contract extension, the university said it would invest further resources into the program's recruiting and equipment budgets and work to cover full cost of attendance.

With the 2021–22 season, the Mavericks, and six other teams formerly in the WCHA, began play in the Central Collegiate Hockey Association, restarting the conference after an eight-year hiatus.

Season-by-season results

Source:

Coaches
As of April 15, 2022

Awards and honors

NCAA

Individual awards

Edward Jeremiah Award
Don Brose: 1979

Hobey Baker Award
Dryden McKay: 2022

Spencer Penrose Award
Mike Hastings: 2015, 2021, 2022

All-American Teams
AHCA First Team All-Americans

2015–16: Matt Leitner, F
2017–18: C. J. Suess, F
2019–20: Dryden McKay, G; Marc Michaelis, F
2021–22: Dryden McKay, G; Nathan Smith, F

AHCA Second Team All-Americans

2002–03: Shane Joseph, F; Grant Stevenson, F
2005–06: David Backes, F
2014–15: Zach Palmquist, D
2016–17: Daniel Brickley, D
2019–20: Connor Mackey, F
2020–21: Dryden McKay, G

NCHA

Individual awards

MVP
Tom Kern, F: 1983

Coach of the Year
Don Brose: 1987

All-Conference Teams
First Team All-NCHA

1981–82: Jim Follmer, F
1982–83: Pat Carroll, F; Tom Kern, F
1983–84: John Anderson, D
1984–85: Mark Gustafson, D; Pat Carroll, F
1985–86: Ken Hilgert, G; Troy Jutting, F
1986–87: Ken Hilgert, G; Scott Jenewein, D
1987–88: Dan Horn, D
1989–90: Terry Hughes, D
1990–91: Glen Prodahl, G
1991–92: Brian Langlot, G; Tim Potter, D

Second Team All-NCHA

1981–82: John Anderson, D; Tom Kern, F
1982–83: Mike Hill, D

WCHA

Individual awards

Player of the Year
C. J. Suess: 2018
Marc Michaelis: 2020
Dryden McKay: 2021

Offensive Player of the Year
Marc Michaelis: 2020
Julian Napravnik: 2021

Defensive Player of the Year
Casey Nelson: 2016
Daniel Brickley: 2017

Goaltender of the Year
Dryden McKay: 2020, 2021

Rookie of the Year
Stephon Williams: 2013
Marc Michaelis: 2017
Jake Jaremko: 2018
Lucas Sowder: 2020
Akito Hirose: 2021

Outstanding Student-Athlete of the Year
Steven Johns: 2005
Joel Hanson: 2008
Max Coatta: 2019
Edwin Hookenson: 2020

Coach of the Year
Don Brose: 2000
Troy Jutting: 2003, 2008
Mike Hastings: 2013, 2015, 2019, 2021

Most Valuable Player in Tournament
Cole Huggins: 2014
Brad McClure: 2015

All-Conference Teams
First Team All-WCHA

2002–03: Shane Joseph, F; Grant Stevenson, F
2012–13: Stephon Williams, G
2013–14: Zach Palmquist, D; Matt Leitner, F
2014–15: Zach Palmquist, D; Matt Leitner, F
2015–16: Casey Nelson, D; Teodors Bļugers, F
2016–17: Daniel Brickley, D; Marc Michaelis, F
2017–18: C. J. Suess, F; Marc Michaelis, F
2018–19: Marc Michaelis, F
2019–20: Dryden McKay, G; Connor Mackey, D; Marc Michaelis, F
2020–21: Dryden McKay, G; Julian Napravnik, F

Second Team All-WCHA

2005–06: David Backes, F
2006–07: Travis Morin, F
2013–14: Cole Huggins, G; Jean-Paul Lafontaine, F
2014–15: Stephon Williams, G; Casey Nelson, D; Bryce Gervais, F
2016–17: C. J. Franklin, F
2017–18: Daniel Brickley, D
2018–19: Dryden McKay, G; Parker Tuomie, F
2019–20: Parker Tuomie, F
2020–21: Nathan Smith, F

Third Team All-WCHA

1999–00: Aaron Fox, F
2000–01: Ben Christopherson, D
2003–04: Shane Joseph, F
2004–05: David Backes, F
2006–07: Steve Wagner, D
2008–09: Kurt Davis, D
2010–11: Kurt Davis, D
2012–13: Matt Leitner, F; Eriah Hayes, F
2013–14: Johnny McInnis, F; Zach Lehrke, F
2015–16: Bryce Gervais, F
2016–17: Brad McClure, D
2017–18: Connor LaCouvee, G; Ian Scheid, D; Zeb Knutson, F
2018–19: Connor Mackey, D; Ian Scheid, D
2019–20: Ian Scheid, D
2020–21: Akito Hirose, D; Riese Zmolek, D

All-WCHA Rookie Team

2003–04: David Backes, F
2005–06: Dan Tormey, G
2011–12: Jean-Paul Lafontaine, F
2012–13: Stephin Williams, G
2013–14: Cole Huggins, G; Sean Flanagan, D
2014–15: C. J. Franklin, F
2015–16: Daniel Brickley, D; Max Coatta, F
2016–17: Ian Scheid, D; Marc Michaelis, F
2017–18: Connor Mackey, D; Jake Jaremko, F; Reggie Lutz, F
2018–19: Dryden McKay, G; Ashton Calder, F; Julian Napravnik, F
2019–20: Lucas Sowder, F; Nathan Smith, F
2020–21: Akito Hirose, D; Jake Livingstone, D

CCHA

Individual awards

Player of the Year
Dryden McKay: 2022

Forward of the Year
Nathan Smith: 2022
David Silye: 2023

Defenseman of the Year
Jake Livingstone: 2022, 2023

Goaltender of the Year
Dryden McKay: 2022

Coach of the Year
Mike Hastings: 2022

All-Conference Teams
First Team All-CCHA

2021–22: Dryden McKay, G; Jake Livingstone, D; Nathan Smith, F; Julian Napravnik, F
2022–23: Jake Livingstone, D; David Silye, F

Second Team All-CCHA

2022–23: Akito Hirose, D

CCHA All-Rookie Team

2021–22: Bennett Zmolek, D

Statistical leaders
Source:

Career points leaders

Career goaltending leaders

GP = Games played; Min = Minutes played; W = Wins; L = Losses; T = Ties; GA = Goals against; SO = Shutouts; SV% = Save percentage; GAA = Goals against average

Minimum 30 games

Statistics current through the start of the 2021-22 season.

Players

Current roster
As of August 6, 2022.

|}

Olympians
This is a list of Minnesota State alumni were a part of an Olympic team.

Mavericks in the NHL
As of June 19, 2022

Source:

See also
 Minnesota State Mavericks women's ice hockey

References

External links

 
Ice hockey teams in Minnesota